Vertigo is an album by American saxophonist Jackie McLean recorded in 1962 and 1963 but not released on the Blue Note label until 1980. The initial release contained only the five tracks from 1963 (with the additional track "Formidable" from 1959, later released as a bonus track on New Soil), while the later 2000 limited CD edition, released as part of the "Connoisseur Series", added six tracks from a 1962 session originally marked for release as Jackie McLean Quintet (BLP 4116), first issued in 1978 as part of a double LP entitled Hipnosis.

Reception
The Allmusic review by Scott Yanow stated that "the music ranges from catchy funk and hard bop to strong hints of the avant-garde".  The JazzTimes review by Bill Shoemaker said: "McLean really doesn't stray far from the winning Blue Note formula of smartly constructed hard bop and blues on the date, which, given the groundswell stemming from One Step Beyond and Destination... Out! explains why the date was withheld."

Track listing
All compositions by Jackie McLean, except where indicated.

Original 1980 LP
 "Marney" (Donald Byrd, Bernard Herrmann) - 6:17
 "Dusty Foot" (Byrd) - 6:57
 "Formidable" (Walter Davis, Jr.) - 6:16
 "Vertigo" - 8:20
 "Cheers" - 4:56
 "Yams" (Herbie Hancock) - 8:02

Recorded on May 2, 1959 (#3) and February 11, 1963 (all others).

Personnel

Tracks 1,2,4,5 & 6
Jackie McLean - alto saxophone
Donald Byrd - trumpet
Herbie Hancock - piano
Butch Warren - bass
Tony Williams - drums

Track 3
Jackie McLean - alto saxophone
Donald Byrd - trumpet
Walter Davis Jr. - piano
Paul Chambers - bass
Pete LaRoca - drums

2000 Limited CD
 "Marney" (Byrd, Herrmann) - 6:17
 "Dusty Foot" (Byrd) - 6:57
 "Vertigo" - 8:20
 "Cheers" - 4:56
 "Yams" (Hancock) - 8:02
 "The Three Minors" - 6:05
 "Blues in a Jiff" (Sonny Clark) - 7:12
 "Blues for Jackie" (Kenny Dorham) - 7:53
 "Marilyn's Dilemma" (Billy Higgins) - 5:03
 "Iddy Bitty" - 8:17
 "The Way I Feel" (Butch Warren) - 7:05

Recorded on June 14, 1962 (#6-11) and February 11, 1963 (#1-5).

Personnel

Tracks 1-5
Jackie McLean - alto saxophone
Donald Byrd - trumpet
Herbie Hancock - piano
Butch Warren - bass
Tony Williams - drums

Tracks 6-11
Jackie McLean - alto saxophone
Kenny Dorham - trumpet
Sonny Clark - piano
Butch Warren - bass
Billy Higgins - drums

References

1980 albums
Blue Note Records albums
Jackie McLean albums
Albums recorded at Van Gelder Studio